The Siegel–Schwall Band is the first album by the Chicago-based blues-rock group the Siegel–Schwall Band.  It was released by Vanguard Records in 1966.  It is not to be confused with the band's fifth album, which is also titled The Siegel–Schwall Band.

The Siegel–Schwall Band was produced by Samuel Charters.  It is the band's only album with their original bass player, Jos Davidson.  Before joining the Siegel-Schwall Band, Davidson was the bassist in Steve Miller's band the Ardells.  After leaving Siegel–Schwall, Davidson played with another Chicago blues artist, pianist Otis Spann.

Track listing
Side one:
"Down in the Bottom" (Chester Burnett) – 2:24
"I Have Had All I Can Take" (Corky Siegel) – 3:13
"Boot Hill" ("Jimmy Witherspoon", actually by 'Sly Williams' [possibly Cleo Page]) – 2:54
"When I Get the Time" (Jos Davidson) – 2:59
"I've Got to Go Now" (Siegel) – 2:46
"Mama/Papa" (Jim Schwall) – 1:37
"I'll Be the Man" (Siegel) – 2:38
Side two:
"Little Babe" (Burnett) – 2:46
"Going to New York" (Jimmy Reed) – 3:21
"Mary" (Siegel) – 2:04
"So Glad You're Mine" (Arthur Crudup) – 3:41
"Hoochie Coochie Man" (Willie Dixon) – 6:46
"Break Song" (Siegel, Schwall, Davidson, Russ Chadwick) – 2:20

Personnel

The Siegel-Schwall Band
Corky Siegel – piano, harmonica, vocals
Jim Schwall – guitar, vocals
Jos Davidson – bass, vocals
Russ Chadwick – drums

Production
Samuel Charters – producer

References

Siegel–Schwall Band albums
1966 debut albums
Vanguard Records albums
Albums produced by Samuel Charters